The 2012 Manitoba Lotteries Women's Curling Classic was held October 19 to 22 at the Fort Rouge Curling Club in Winnipeg, Manitoba. It was the second women's Grand Slam event of the 2012–13 curling season, and this edition of the event marked the ninth time that the tournament has been held. The purse for the event was CAD$60,000, of which the winner, Stefanie Lawton, received CAD$15,000. Lawton defeated Rachel Homan in the final with a score of 6–4.

Teams
The teams are listed as follows:

Knockout results
The draw is listed as follows:

A event

B event

C event

Playoffs

References

External links

Manitoba Lotteries Women's Curling Classic
Manitoba Lotteries Women's Curling Classic
Women's curling competitions in Canada
Curling competitions in Winnipeg